Karaisali Bucağı railway station is a railway station in the village of Bucak, Adana in Turkey. The station consists of an island platform serving two tracks, with a third track as a siding.

TCDD Taşımacılık operates two daily intercity trains from Konya and Kayseri to Adana.

References

External links
TCDD Taşımacılık
Passenger trains
Karaisali Bucağı station timetable

Railway stations in Adana Province